The R766 road is a regional road in Ireland. The road connects Bray with its eastern suburbs and the seaside.

Route
The route begins at the junction of Bray Main Street and Quinnsborough Road. The route heads east down the Quinnsborough Road, passing the Carlisle Grounds and Bray Daly Station, crossing the level crossing and heading south along the Strand Road. The Strand Road is southbound only so northbound traffic follows the Meath Road instead. The route then heads west up the hill of the Putland Road. The route terminates at its junction with the R761 at The Vevay.

See also
Roads in Ireland

References
Roads Act 1993 (Classification of Regional Roads) Order 2006 – Department of Transport

Regional roads in the Republic of Ireland
Roads in County Wicklow